Interstate Highways are owned and maintained by INDOT unless it is a toll road.

The system was authorized by the Federal-Aid Highway Act of 1956, which provided federal funds for construction of limited access highways. Indiana's initial set of seven Interstate Highways were announced in September 1957.

Primary Interstates

Auxiliary Interstates

References

Interstate Highways in Indiana
Lists of roads in Indiana